"One & Only" is a song by New Zealand pop group Deep Obsession, notable for being the third of the group's three consecutive number-one singles in New Zealand. "One & Only" was the first Deep Obsession single released after founding member Christopher Banks had left the group. "One & Only" was certified gold in New Zealand and was ranked the 13th-most-popular single of New Zealand at the end of 1999.

Music video
In 1999, a music video was released for the song, directed by Ian McLean. The video features singers Zara Clark and Vanessa Kelly, placing them in a surreal environment including a large number of fish tanks.

Track listings

CD, maxi-single (New Zealand, 1999)
 "One & Only" (radio remix) – 3:47
 "One & Only" (original mix) – 4:03
 "One & Only" (club edit) – 4:02
 "One & Only" (extended club mix) – 7:06
 "E-Motion" – 5:22

CD, maxi-single (Europe, 1999)
 "One & Only" (radio edit) – 3:31
 "One & Only" (extended version) – 5:03
 "One & Only" (original) – 3:47
 "One & Only" (extended club mix) – 7:06

CD single (United States, 1999)
 "One & Only" (remix) – 3:29
 "One & Only" (extended remix) – 5:04
 "One & Only" (original mix) – 3:47

CD single (Australia, 1999)
 "One & Only" (radio mix) – 3:50
 "One & Only" (Brian Rawling radio mix) – 3:31
 "One & Only" (extended club mix) – 7:06

CD single (United States, 1999)
 "One & Only" (remix) – 3:29
 "One & Only" (extended remix) – 5:04

12-inch vinyl (Italy, 2000)
 "One & Only" (extended version) – 5:03
 "One & Only" (radio edit) – 3:31
 "One & Only" (extended club mix) – 7:06
 "One & Only" (original) – 3:47

CD single (United States, 2000)
 "One & Only" (radio mix) – 3:31
 "One & Only" (extended mix) – 5:03

Enhanced CD (Australia, 2000)
 "One & Only" (radio mix)	3:47
 "One & Only" (Brian Rawling radio mix) – 3:31
 "One & Only" (Brian Rawling extended mix) – 5:03
 "One & Only" (club edit) – 4:02
 "One & Only" (extended club mix) – 7:06
 "E-Motion" – 5:22
 "One & Only" (video)

Charts

Weekly chart

Year-end chart

Certifications

Release history

References

1999 songs
1999 singles
Deep Obsession songs
Number-one singles in New Zealand
Universal Music Group singles